Joshua G. Grizzard (born June 11, 1990) is an American football coach who is  the offensive quality control coach for the Miami Dolphins of the National Football League (NFL).

Early life and playing career 
A native of Zebulon, North Carolina, Grizzard was a two-sport athlete at East Wake High School, where he played basketball and football. A two-way player who played quarterback and safety, he was his class' valedictorian, graduating with a 4.75 GPA. He played college football at Yale from 2008 to 2011 before opting to switch to a student coaching position.

Coaching career 
After graduating from Yale in 2012, Grizzard interned with the Carolina Panthers as an operations intern during their training camp.

Grizzard coached at Duke from 2013 to 2016 as a graduate assistant/quality control coach, working with the Blue Devil quarterbacks.

Miami Dolphins 
He was retained by new head coach Brian Flores and reassigned to a general quality control coaching position in 2019.

Grizzard was promoted to wide receivers coach in 2020. In 2022, he was retained by Mike McDaniel and went back to being a quality control coach.

References

External links 
 
 Miami Dolphins bio
 Yale Bulldogs bio

1990 births
Living people
People from Zebulon, North Carolina
Players of American football from North Carolina
American football safeties
Yale Bulldogs football players
Yale Bulldogs football coaches
Yale University alumni
Duke Blue Devils football coaches
Miami Dolphins coaches